Alban may refer to:

Alban (surname)
Alban (given name)
Alban people, Latin people from the city of Alba Longa.
Things or people from or related to Alba (Gaelic for 'Scotland')
Alban wine, a wine of Ancient Rome from Colli Albani
Alban Vineyards, California wine produced by vintner John Alban
An alternative name used in Spain for wines made from the Palomino (grape)
A minor Kazakh Jüz "horde", numbering ca. 100,000

Places
Alban hills of Rome, Italy ( also known as Colli Albania )
Alban, Tarn, France 
Alban, Wisconsin, US, a town
Alban (community), Wisconsin, US, an unincorporated community
Alban, Ontario, Canada
Albán, Colombia
Albán, Cundinamarca, Colombia
Yr Alban, Welsh for Scotland

See also
Albany (disambiguation)
Albania (disambiguation)
Albanian (disambiguation)
Saint-Alban (disambiguation)
St. Albans (disambiguation)
St Albans railway station (disambiguation)
St. Albans School (disambiguation)